Empress Yehe Nara may refer to:

Empress Xiaocigao (Qing dynasty) (1575–1603), consort of Nurhaci of the Later Jin dynasty
Empress Dowager Cixi (1835–1908), consort of the Xianfeng Emperor
Empress Dowager Longyu (1868–1913), wife of the Guangxu Emperor

See also
Empress Nara
Empress Ula Nara (disambiguation)